1998 Vissel Kobe season

Competitions

Domestic results

J.League

Emperor's Cup

J.League Cup

Player statistics

Other pages
 J.League official site

Vissel Kobe
Vissel Kobe seasons